Kwaku Boateng may refer to:

 Kwaku Boateng (high jumper) (born 1974), Canadian high jumper
 Kwaku Boateng (politician) (1926–2006), cabinet minister in Ghana in the early 1960s
 Kwaku Boateng (Canadian football) (born 1995), Canadian football player
 Kwaku Agyenim Boateng (born 1972), Ghanaian politician